Playgirls International is a 1963 American nudist film produced and directed by Doris Wishman.

Plot

Cast

See also
List of American films of 1963
Nudity in film

External links 

1963 films
1963 documentary films
1960s English-language films
American LGBT-related films
1960s exploitation films
Films directed by Doris Wishman
1963 LGBT-related films
Documentary films about LGBT topics
1960s American films
American documentary films